Atlanta Regional Airport , also known as Falcon Field, is a public use airport in Fayette County, Georgia, United States. It is located 25 nautical miles (29 mi, 46 km) southwest of the central business district of Atlanta, in Peachtree City. This airport is included in the National Plan of Integrated Airport Systems for 2017–2021, which categorized it as a regional general aviation facility.

Owned by Peachtree City Airport Authority, it was formerly known as Peachtree City Airport or Peachtree City - Falcon Field Airport. Falcon Field was named by the first city clerk, Emelil Fancher, in honor of the Atlanta Falcons. It is the location for the National Weather Service's Atlanta forecast office, which serves almost all of northern and central Georgia.

Although most U.S. airports use the same three-letter location identifier for the FAA and IATA, Falcon Field is assigned FFC by the FAA but has no designation from the IATA.

Facilities and aircraft 
Atlanta Regional Airport covers an area of 350 acres (142 ha) at an elevation of 808 feet (246 m) above mean sea level. It has one runway designated 13/31 with an asphalt surface measuring 5,768 by 100 feet (1,758 x 30 m).

In 2016, the airport had 75,000 aircraft operations, an average of 205 per day: 99% general aviation and 1% military. In May 2017, there were 183 aircraft based at this airport: 152 single-engine, 23 multi-engine, 3 jet, and 5 helicopter.

Businesses located on-field include:

 Aircraft Spruce & Specialty Co, with a  distribution facility located adjacent to the field
 Atlanta East Aviation, Part 135, Part 61 training
 Gardner Aviation
 Georgia Aircraft Interiors
 Falcon Aviation Academy, training
 Affordable Charters of Excellence, Part 135
 Commemorative Air Force's Airbase Georgia
 Georgia Wing Civil Air Patrol

The airport also hosts The Great Georgia Airshow.

References

External links 
 Atlanta Regional Airport, official site
 Aerial image as of Mid 2000s from Google Earth
 

Airports in Georgia (U.S. state)
Buildings and structures in Fayette County, Georgia
Transportation in Fayette County, Georgia